Daniil Vladimirovich Vorobyov (born 30 August 1981) is a Russian film and theatre actor.

Early life
Daniil Vorobyov was born in Kostroma, Russian SFSR, Soviet Union. The son of Vladimir Vorobyov, a jazz musician, and Svetlana Yurovskaya. At the age of 14 started to work on local radio station as DJ. Later began to run parties as MC in city night club. Because of night life and the dubious glory his mother decided it's time to Daniil to join the army. After two years military service Daniil moved to Moscow to change the course of life and to make his childhood dream come true. He went to Gerasimov Institute of Cinematography and had successfully applied. Was entering the acting course supervised by Alexander Lenkov. In the second year of study Daniil made his film debut in TV series Junker'a.
Afterwards, he star at The voice of fish and it's proved to be a breakthrough for Daniil.

Career
In 2012 he starred as charismatic Boss, a leader of Eastern European criminal gang, in Robin Campillo's film Eastern Boys. In 2013 film won at Venice Film Festival in category Horizons Award for Best Film. In 2015 film was nominated to César Award as Best Film.

In 2015, Daniil starred in Paloma Aguilera Valdebenito's Out Of Love, playing Nikolay. Film was selected for IFFR's Bright Future. Daniil received Angela Awards for his portraying of the role. In 2017 Daniil won the RIVIERA IFF as Best Actor for Out Of Love.

In 2016 Vorobyov starred opposite Julia Stiles and Iwan Rheon in Riviera, crime series from Neil Jordan.

Selected filmography

References

External links 
 

1981 births
Living people
People from Kostroma
Russian male film actors
Russian male television actors
Russian male stage actors
Male actors from Moscow
20th-century Russian male actors
21st-century Russian male actors
Russian film directors